Lieutenant Walter Alister Kirk (1887-1961) was a World War I flying ace credited with seven aerial victories.

References

1887 births
1961 deaths
Australian military personnel of World War I
Military personnel from Belfast
Australian World War I flying aces